The 2005–06 New Zealand V8 season (the leading motorsport category in New Zealand) consisted of seven rounds beginning on 4 November 2005 and ending 23 April 2006. The defending champion was Andy Booth, although it would be Kayne Scott who would win his first New Zealand V8 Touring Car championship.

Teams and drivers

Calendar

Points structure
Points for the 2005/2006 championship are allocated as follows:

Driver standings

References

NZ Touring Cars Championship seasons
V8 season
V8 season